"Candidatus Caballeronia hispidae" is a bacterium from the genus Caballeronia and the family Burkholderiaceae.>

References

Burkholderiaceae
Bacteria described in 2012
Candidatus taxa